Christopher Lowell (born October 17, 1984) is an American actor. He is best known for playing the roles of Stosh "Piz" Piznarski in the television series Veronica Mars (2006–2007), William "Dell" Parker in the television series Private Practice (2007–2010), and Sebastian "Bash" Howard in the television series GLOW (2017–2019). He has also appeared in films, notably Up in the Air (2009), The Help (2011), and Promising Young Woman (2020), all of which were nominated for the Academy Award for Best Picture.

Lowell made his directorial debut with the film Beside Still Waters (2013), which he also co-produced and co-wrote the screenplay for.

Early life and education
Lowell was born in Atlanta, Georgia. He attended the Atlanta International School, where he became interested in theatre and filmmaking. He attended the University of Southern California, where he was discovered in his first year while playing beach volleyball.

Career
Discovered in 2003 after going through his first major audition, Lowell landed the role of Jonathan Fields on the ABC teen drama Life As We Know It. The series was cancelled after 13 episodes.

In 2006, Lowell had lead roles in the coming-of-age film Graduation and also in a small film entitled You Are Here.

After the end of Life As We Know It, Lowell was cast as Stosh "Piz" Piznarski in the third season of Veronica Mars, opposite Kristen Bell and Jason Dohring.

In 2009 Chris Lowell appeared in several videos by the sketch comedy group BriTANicK, including "Pillow Talk", and "The Morning After."

From 2007 until 2010, Lowell appeared in the ABC drama Private Practice, alongside Kate Walsh, Audra McDonald, and Tim Daly, playing Dell, the receptionist for the Oceanside Wellness Group who was also a qualified nurse, midwife-in-training, and young father to six-year-old daughter Betsy. Lowell exited Private Practice in the show's third-season finale when Dell died from heart failure, a complication during brain surgery after a vehicle accident.

In 2011, Lowell played the role of Stuart Whitworth in the film The Help, an adaptation of Kathryn Stockett's 2009 novel of the same name. The following year, filming began on Lowell's directorial debut, Beside Still Waters. Set in Michigan’s Upper Peninsula, the film tells the story of a man redefining his outlook on life after the death of his parents.

Lowell also played Derrick on Fox's 2014 comedy Enlisted.

Lowell is also a vocalist and harmonicist for the indie acoustic band Two Shots for Poe.

He starred in the Off-Broadway hit  Jacuzzi at Ars Nova in New York City.

In May 2021, Lowell was cast in the How I Met Your Mother spinoff series How I Met Your Father, led by Hilary Duff. In November 2021, Duff and the cast confirmed via social media accounts that the series would premiere on January 18, 2022. On February 15, 2022, Hulu renewed the series for a 20-episode second season.
He plays the role of producer Sebastian “Bash” Howard in the 2017-19 Netflix series GLOW.

Personal life
Lowell and his longtime girlfriend, actress Kerry Bishé, have a daughter who was born in 2021.

Filmography

Film

Television

References

External links
 
 Chris Lowell cast bio on The CW
 Chris Lowell and his band Two Shots for Poe
 PopGurls Interview: Chris Lowell

1984 births
American male television actors
Living people
Outstanding Performance by a Cast in a Motion Picture Screen Actors Guild Award winners
Male actors from Atlanta
University of Southern California alumni
American male film actors
21st-century American male actors
21st-century American singers
21st-century American male singers